is a resonant trans-Neptunian object, approximately  in diameter, located in the outermost region of the Solar System. It was discovered by Slovak astronomer Tomáš Vorobjov from images taken on the night of 19 April 2012, at the Astronomical Research Institute  in Illinois, United States. This minor planet was numbered (432949) by the Minor Planet Center on 4 April 2015. , it has not been named. 

 is a resonant trans-Neptunian object in an uncommon 4:5 resonance with Neptune (DES: 5:4E). It orbits the Sun at a distance of 29.2–40.4 AU once every 205 years and 4 months (75,008 days; semi-major axis of 34.81 AU). Its orbit has an eccentricity of 0.16 and an inclination of 29° with respect to the ecliptic. It is currently 29.8 AU from the Sun.

, no rotational lightcurve of  has been obtained from photometric observations. The body's rotation period, pole and shape remain unknown.

References

External links 
 MPEC 2012-H36 : DAILY ORBIT UPDATE (2012 APR. 21 UT) (Discovery mention on Daily Orbit Update)
 MPEC 2012-L20 : 2012 HH2 (Revision to MPEC 2012-J31)
 Home page of the Astronomical Research Institute
 

432949
Discoveries by Tomáš Vorobjov
20120419